Czech Republic competed at the 2015 European Games, in Baku, Azerbaijan from 12 to 28 June 2015.

Medalists

Badminton

Men

Women

Mixed

Cycling

 Women's time trial: Zuzana Neckářová – 27th

Gymnastics

Aerobic
Czech Republic has qualified one athlete after the performance at the 2013 Aerobic Gymnastics European Championships.
 Groups – 1 team of 5 athletes

Artistic
Women's – 3 quota places

Rhythmic
Czech Republic has qualified one athlete after the performance at the 2013 Rhythmic Gymnastics European Championships.
 Individual – 1 quota place

Triathlon

Men's – Tomáš Svoboda, František Kubínek, František Linduška
Women's – Petra Kuříková, Jitka Šimáková

References

Nations at the 2015 European Games
European Games
2015